Olkhovka is the name of several rural localities in Russia.

Modern rural localities

Republic of Bashkortostan
As of 2010, four rural localities in the Republic of Bashkortostan bear this name:
Olkhovka, Bizhbulyaksky District, Republic of Bashkortostan, a village in Demsky Selsoviet of Bizhbulyaksky District
Olkhovka, Blagoveshchensky District, Republic of Bashkortostan, a village in Novonadezhdinsky Selsoviet of Blagoveshchensky District
Olkhovka, Kuyurgazinsky District, Republic of Bashkortostan, a khutor in Otradinsky Selsoviet of Kuyurgazinsky District
Olkhovka, Tuymazinsky District, Republic of Bashkortostan, a village in Nikolayevsky Selsoviet of Tuymazinsky District

Belgorod Oblast
As of 2010, one rural locality in Belgorod Oblast bears this name:
Olkhovka, Belgorod Oblast, a selo in Yakovlevsky District

Bryansk Oblast
As of 2010, six rural localities in Bryansk Oblast bear this name:
Olkhovka, Karachevsky District, Bryansk Oblast, a village in Verkhopolsky Selsoviet of Karachevsky District
Olkhovka, Kurshanovichsky Selsoviet, Klimovsky District, Bryansk Oblast, a settlement in Kurshanovichsky Selsoviet of Klimovsky District
Olkhovka, Vorobyevsky Selsoviet, Klimovsky District, Bryansk Oblast, a village in Vorobyevsky Selsoviet of Klimovsky District
Olkhovka, Klintsovsky District, Bryansk Oblast, a selo in Olkhovsky Selsoviet of Klintsovsky District
Olkhovka, Vygonichsky District, Bryansk Oblast, a village in Ormensky Selsoviet of Vygonichsky District
Olkhovka, Zhukovsky District, Bryansk Oblast, a village in Zaborsko-Nikolsky Selsoviet of Zhukovsky District

Chelyabinsk Oblast
As of 2010, one rural locality in Chelyabinsk Oblast bears this name:
Olkhovka, Chelyabinsk Oblast, a settlement in Velikopetrovsky Selsoviet of Kartalinsky District

Ivanovo Oblast
As of 2010, one rural locality in Ivanovo Oblast bears this name:
Olkhovka, Ivanovo Oblast, a village in Ivanovsky District

Kaliningrad Oblast
As of 2010, one rural locality in Kaliningrad Oblast bears this name:
Olkhovka, Kaliningrad Oblast, a settlement in Zorinsky Rural Okrug of Gvardeysky District

Kaluga Oblast
As of 2010, two rural localities in Kaluga Oblast bear this name:
Olkhovka, Kozelsky District, Kaluga Oblast, a village in Kozelsky District
Olkhovka, Medynsky District, Kaluga Oblast, a village in Medynsky District

Kostroma Oblast
As of 2010, one rural locality in Kostroma Oblast bears this name:
Olkhovka, Kostroma Oblast, a village in Kuzhbalskoye Settlement of Neysky District

Krasnoyarsk Krai
As of 2010, one rural locality in Krasnoyarsk Krai bears this name:
Olkhovka, Krasnoyarsk Krai, a selo in Tarutinsky Selsoviet of Achinsky District

Kurgan Oblast
As of 2010, two rural localities in Kurgan Oblast bear this name:
Olkhovka, Dalmatovsky District, Kurgan Oblast, a village in Beloyarsky Selsoviet of Dalmatovsky District
Olkhovka, Shadrinsky District, Kurgan Oblast, a selo in Olkhovsky Selsoviet of Shadrinsky District

Kursk Oblast
As of 2010, two rural localities in Kursk Oblast bear this name:
Olkhovka, Khomutovsky District, Kursk Oblast, a selo in Olkhovsky Selsoviet of Khomutovsky District
Olkhovka, Zheleznogorsky District, Kursk Oblast, a settlement in Troyanovsky Selsoviet of Zheleznogorsky District

Leningrad Oblast
As of 2010, one rural locality in Leningrad Oblast bears this name:
Olkhovka, Leningrad Oblast, a village in Petrovskoye Settlement Municipal Formation of Priozersky District

Lipetsk Oblast
As of 2010, one rural locality in Lipetsk Oblast bears this name:
Olkhovka, Lipetsk Oblast, a selo in Nizhnematrensky Selsoviet of Dobrinsky District

Republic of Mordovia
As of 2010, one rural locality in the Republic of Mordovia bears this name:
Olkhovka, Republic of Mordovia, a settlement in Krasinsky Selsoviet of Dubyonsky District

Moscow Oblast
As of 2010, one rural locality in Moscow Oblast bears this name:
Olkhovka, Moscow Oblast, a village in Semenovskoye Rural Settlement of Stupinsky District

Nizhny Novgorod Oblast
As of 2010, one rural locality in Nizhny Novgorod Oblast bears this name:
Olkhovka, Nizhny Novgorod Oblast, a village in Bolsheokulovsky Selsoviet of Navashinsky District

Novgorod Oblast
As of 2010, three rural localities in Novgorod Oblast bear this name:
Olkhovka, Krestetsky District, Novgorod Oblast, a village in Ustvolmskoye Settlement of Krestetsky District
Olkhovka, Malovishersky District, Novgorod Oblast, a village in Verebyinskoye Settlement of Malovishersky District
Olkhovka, Okulovsky District, Novgorod Oblast, a village in Borovenkovskoye Settlement of Okulovsky District

Novosibirsk Oblast
As of 2010, one rural locality in Novosibirsk Oblast bears this name:
Olkhovka, Novosibirsk Oblast, a settlement under the administrative jurisdiction of  the work settlement of Chistoozyornoye, Chistoozyorny District

Omsk Oblast
As of 2010, two rural localities in Omsk Oblast bear this name:
Olkhovka, Cherlaksky District, Omsk Oblast, a village in Tatarsky Rural Okrug of Cherlaksky District
Olkhovka, Okoneshnikovsky District, Omsk Oblast, a village in Sergeyevsky Rural Okrug of Okoneshnikovsky District

Penza Oblast
As of 2010, one rural locality in Penza Oblast bears this name:
Olkhovka, Penza Oblast, a village in Saltykovsky Selsoviet of Zemetchinsky District

Perm Krai
As of 2010, ten rural localities in Perm Krai bear this name:
Olkhovka, Chaykovsky, Perm Krai, a selo under the administrative jurisdiction of the town of krai significance of Chaykovsky
Olkhovka, Dobryanka, Perm Krai, a settlement under the administrative jurisdiction of the town of krai significance of Dobryanka
Olkhovka, Cherdynsky District, Perm Krai, a settlement in Cherdynsky District
Olkhovka, Chernushinsky District, Perm Krai, a village in Chernushinsky District
Olkhovka, Kungursky District, Perm Krai, a village in Kungursky District
Olkhovka, Nytvensky District, Perm Krai, a village in Nytvensky District
Olkhovka, Osinsky District, Perm Krai, a village in Osinsky District
Olkhovka (settlement), Permsky District, Perm Krai, a settlement in Permsky District
Olkhovka (village), Permsky District, Perm Krai, a village in Permsky District
Olkhovka, Sivinsky District, Perm Krai, a village in Sivinsky District

Primorsky Krai
As of 2010, one rural locality in Primorsky Krai bears this name:
Olkhovka, Primorsky Krai, a selo in Kirovsky District

Ryazan Oblast
As of 2010, two rural localities in Ryazan Oblast bear this name:
Olkhovka, Chuchkovsky District, Ryazan Oblast, a village in Pertovsky Rural Okrug of Chuchkovsky District
Olkhovka, Alexandro-Nevsky District, Ryazan Oblast, a village in Blagovsky Rural Okrug of Alexandro-Nevsky District

Sakhalin Oblast
As of 2010, one rural locality in Sakhalin Oblast bears this name:
Olkhovka, Sakhalin Oblast, a selo in Uglegorsky District

Saratov Oblast
As of 2010, two rural localities in Saratov Oblast bear this name:
Olkhovka, Romanovsky District, Saratov Oblast, a selo in Romanovsky District
Olkhovka, Rtishchevsky District, Saratov Oblast, a village in Rtishchevsky District

Smolensk Oblast
As of 2010, one rural locality in Smolensk Oblast bears this name:
Olkhovka, Smolensk Oblast, a village in Volkovskoye Rural Settlement of Krasninsky District

Sverdlovsk Oblast
As of 2010, four rural localities in Sverdlovsk Oblast bear this name:
Olkhovka, Verkhnyaya Pyshma, Sverdlovsk Oblast, a settlement under the administrative jurisdiction of the Town of Verkhnyaya Pyshma
Olkhovka, Irbitsky District, Sverdlovsk Oblast, a village in Irbitsky District
Olkhovka, Kamyshlovsky District, Sverdlovsk Oblast, a settlement in Kamyshlovsky District
Olkhovka, Sysertsky District, Sverdlovsk Oblast, a village in Sysertsky District

Tambov Oblast
As of 2010, one rural locality in Tambov Oblast bears this name:
Olkhovka, Tambov Oblast, a selo in Parevsky Selsoviet of Inzhavinsky District

Tver Oblast
As of 2010, three rural localities in Tver Oblast bear this name:
Olkhovka, Maksatikhinsky District, Tver Oblast, a village in Maksatikhinsky District
Olkhovka, Spirovsky District, Tver Oblast, a settlement in Spirovsky District
Olkhovka, Toropetsky District, Tver Oblast, a village in Toropetsky District

Udmurt Republic
As of 2010, one rural locality in the Udmurt Republic bears this name:
Olkhovka, Udmurt Republic, a village in Uva-Tuklinsky Selsoviet of Uvinsky District

Ulyanovsk Oblast
As of 2010, one rural locality in Ulyanovsk Oblast bears this name:
Olkhovka, Ulyanovsk Oblast, a selo in Khmelevsky Rural Okrug of Sursky District

Volgograd Oblast
As of 2010, one rural locality in Volgograd Oblast bears this name:
Olkhovka, Volgograd Oblast, a selo in Olkhovsky Selsoviet of Olkhovsky District

Vologda Oblast
As of 2010, one rural locality in Vologda Oblast bears this name:
Olkhovka, Vologda Oblast, a village in Ust-Alexeyevsky Selsoviet of Velikoustyugsky District

Yaroslavl Oblast
As of 2010, one rural locality in Yaroslavl Oblast bears this name:
Olkhovka, Yaroslavl Oblast, a village in Dmitriyevsky Rural Okrug of Danilovsky District

Abolished rural localities
Olkhovka, Tyumen Oblast, a settlement in Zavodoukovsky District of Tyumen Oblast; abolished in November 2008